is a professional Japanese baseball player. He plays pitcher for the Yokohama DeNA BayStars.

External links

 NPB.com

1995 births
Living people
Baseball people from Okinawa Prefecture
Japanese expatriate baseball players in Puerto Rico
Nippon Professional Baseball pitchers
Yomiuri Giants players
Yokohama DeNA BayStars players
Gigantes de Carolina players